This is a list of Royal Air Force glider units.

Gliding Schools
+data

1-100

100-200

200-700

Volunteer Gliding Schools
+data

Other Glider units
+data 

 Home Command Gliding Instructors School became Home Command Gliding Centre became 1 Home Command Gliding Centre became 1 Gliding Centre became Central Gliding School
 2 Home Command Gliding Centre became 2 Gliding Centre became Central Gliding School
 Glider Exercise Unit RAF -> Glider Exercise Squadron RAF -> No. 296 Squadron RAF
 Central Gliding School
 Heavy Glider Conversion Unit RAF
 No. 21 Heavy Glider Conversion Unit RAF
 No. 22 Heavy Glider Conversion Unit RAF
 No. 23 Heavy Glider Conversion Unit RAF
 No. 101 (Glider) Operational Training Unit RAF
 No. 102 (Glider) Operational Training Unit RAF
 No. 668 Squadron RAF
 No. 669 Squadron RAF
 No. 670 Squadron RAF
 No. 671 Squadron RAF
 No. 672 Squadron RAF
 No. 673 Squadron RAF

See also

Royal Air Force

List of Royal Air Force aircraft squadrons
List of Royal Air Force aircraft independent flights
List of conversion units of the Royal Air Force
List of Royal Air Force Glider units
List of Royal Air Force Operational Training Units
List of Royal Air Force schools
List of Royal Air Force units & establishments
List of RAF squadron codes
List of RAF Regiment units
List of Battle of Britain squadrons
List of wings of the Royal Air Force
Royal Air Force roundels

Army Air Corps

List of Army Air Corps aircraft units

Fleet Air Arm

List of Fleet Air Arm aircraft squadrons
List of Fleet Air Arm groups
List of aircraft units of the Royal Navy
List of aircraft wings of the Royal Navy

Others

List of Air Training Corps squadrons
University Air Squadron
Air Experience Flight
Volunteer Gliding Squadron
United Kingdom military aircraft serial numbers
United Kingdom aircraft test serials
British military aircraft designation systems

References

Citations

Bibliography

Gliders